The West Temple is a prominent 7,810-foot (2,380 m) mountain summit composed of Navajo Sandstone in Zion National Park in Washington County of Utah, United States. This, the highest feature in Zion Canyon, was originally called "Temp-o-i-tin-car-ur" meaning "Mountain without a trail" by the Paiute people. It was called Steamboat Mountain by local Mormon settlers before 1934, when the USGS officially changed it to its present name, which was applied by John Wesley Powell during his explorations in 1872. West Temple is situated two miles northwest of Springdale, Utah, one mile northeast of Mount Kinesava, and two miles west of the park headquarters. It is one of the notable landmarks in the park. The nearest higher peak is Windy Peak,  to the north. Precipitation runoff from the mountain drains into tributaries of the Virgin River.

Climbing Routes

Climbing Routes on The West Temple
 Southwest Ridge -  - 10 pitches
 Back Where It All Begins -  - 16 pitches
 Big Lebowski-  - 21 pitches
 Lovelace -  - 9 pitches
 Big Lie -  - 2 pitches

Geology
The upper white cliffs are composed of Navajo Sandstone, which in some places exhibit reddish staining caused by hematite (iron oxide), the source of which is the Temple Cap Formation caprock at the summit. Lower slopes and ledges are composed of Kayenta Formation, Moenave Formation, Chinle Formation, and Moenkopi Formation.

Climate

Spring and fall are the most favorable seasons to visit this feature. According to the Köppen climate classification system, it is located in a Cold semi-arid climate zone, which is defined by the coldest month having an average mean temperature below 32 °F (0 °C), and at least 50% of the total annual precipitation being received during the spring and summer.

See also

 Geology of the Zion and Kolob canyons area
 Mount Kinesava
 The Sundial
 The Witch Head
 Three Marys
 Altar of Sacrifice

References

External links

 Zion National Park National Park Service
 National Weather Service: weather forecast
 Web cam

Mountains of Utah
Zion National Park
Mountains of Washington County, Utah
Colorado Plateau
North American 2000 m summits
Sandstone formations of the United States